Companhia Hering (Cia Hering) is a Brazilian textile and retail clothing company, being the leading  clothing textile company  in Latin America. The company has 805 stores. The company is one of the oldest Brazilian companies still in activity, founded by German brothers Bruno and Hermann Hering, in 1880. It was founded in Blumenau, Santa Catarina, and its headquarters and major factories are still in this city. Hering is the major employer in the city (excluding public service jobs).

Hering exports its products worldwide. Currently, the company operates stores in Brazil, Bolivia, Chile, Paraguay, Uruguay and Venezuela.

Brands

Cia. Hering brands are:

Hering  with 617 stores is the company's clothing brand best-known in Brazil. Its style is casual day and daytime.
Hering Kids with 109 stores has the same characteristics as Hering, but is for children.
PUC with 56 stores is also for children, but the clothes are more colorful and sophisticated. It has been already for more than 30 years in the market.
Dzarm with 3 stores is a brand specialized in clothes and accessories for streetwear. The jeans and mesh are the main items of the brand. In 2007 it launched the fragrance Dzarm. Dzarm is part of the casting of the brand's São Paulo Fashion Week, the largest and most important fashion week in Latin America and one of the world's most important.

Stores
Cia Hering opened its first Hering Store in 1993. Today there are 827 stores in operation in Brazil and the world, most installed in shopping malls, being 606 Hering Stores, 76 Hering Kids, 82 PUC stores and 1 Hering for you.

See also

List of Brazilian companies

References

External links
Cia. Hering home page
Hering's home page
Cia. Hering Kids home page
PUC page (children's clothing)
Dzarm home page

Department stores of Brazil
Clothing companies of Brazil
Companies based in Santa Catarina (state)
Companies listed on B3 (stock exchange)
Brazilian brands
Blumenau
Companies established in 1880